A Terminal Operating System, or TOS, is a key part of a supply chain and primarily aims to control the movement and storage of various types of cargo in and around a port or marine terminal. The systems also enables better use of assets, labour and equipment, plan workload, and receive up-to-date information.

Terminal operating systems generally fall under one of two categories depending on supported cargo type, namely, containerized or non-containerized.  Large container terminals typically require yard management functionality in a TOS, whereas bulk dry and liquid cargo terminals do not.

Terminal Operating Systems often use other technologies such as internet, EDI processing, mobile computers, wireless LANs and Radio-frequency identification (RFID) to efficiently monitor the flow of products in, out and around the terminal. Data is either a batch synchronization with, or a real-time wireless transmission to a central database. The database can then provide useful reports about the status of goods, locations and machines in the terminal.

The objective of a terminal operating system is to provide a set of computerized procedures to manage cargo, machines and people within the facility to enable a seamless link to efficiently and effectively manage the facility.

Terminal operating systems can be stand alone systems, managed as a service or use cloud technologies.

In its simplest form, the TOS can data track cargo in and out of a terminal.

Functions 
A Terminal Operating System may be used to do some or all of the following functions:

Shipping 
Terminals requiring various types of ship transport

Container terminals using Containerization for LO-LO (lift on Lift Off) operations such as these require plans for efficiently loading and unloading Container ships docked within their Terminal.

A port using RO-RO ships require plans for efficiently loading automobiles, trucks, semi-trailer trucks, trailers or railroad cars that are driven on and off the ship on their own wheels.

Rail 
Terminals that require the arrival and departure of cargo on trains such as container trains or bulk cargo.

Road 
Handle the receival and release of Cargo for transshipment from other modes of transport or storage.

Yard management 
Creating Shipping list or keeping track of Warehouse levels. Tracking machine moves around the terminal.

Invoicing/Reporting 
Invoicing and providing reports for internal and external use.

Inventory 
Keeping track of Inventory and storing its movements.

Cargo Type 
Various types of cargo can be managed dependent of terminal type.  This includes containers, dry bulk, liquid bulk, break bulk and vehicles (roll-on/roll-off).

External Clients
Terminals may wish to communicate with the following through their Terminal Operating System:
 Terminal operators
 Freight forwarder
 Shipping line or shipping agent
 Container operators
 Port authority
 Pilots, tugs and mooring gang
 Cargo owner (eg. oil companies)
 Customs office

Vendors/Suppliers 
There are several suppliers of Terminal Operating Systems available.

 Autostore TOS, TBA Group 
 Cofano
 CommTrac
 GullsEye
 Hogia
 Infyz
 iPortman
 LynkGrid
 Mainsail
 MarineBerth
 Master Terminal
 Navis
 Octopi (by Navis)
 OPUS Terminal
 OSCAR
 Solvo.TOS
 Softpak 
 Total Soft Bank
 Vertti
 Proycom

See also 
Electronic data interchange

References

External links
 How to Choose a Terminal Operating System

Logistics